Stefan Peter (born 10 April 1975) is an Austrian equestrian. He competed in the individual dressage event at the 2000 Summer Olympics.

References

External links
 

1975 births
Living people
Austrian male equestrians
Austrian dressage riders
Olympic equestrians of Austria
Equestrians at the 2000 Summer Olympics
People from Bregenz
Sportspeople from Vorarlberg